The handwritten document known as the Jerilderie Letter was dictated by Australian bushranger Ned Kelly to fellow Kelly Gang member Joe Byrne in 1879. It is one of only two original Kelly letters known to have survived.

The Jerilderie Letter is a 56-page document of approximately 8,000 words. In the letter Kelly tries to justify his actions, including the murder of three policemen in October 1878 at Stringybark Creek. He describes cases of alleged police corruption and calls for justice for poor families.

It is a longer and more detailed version of the Cameron/Euroa Letter which Kelly sent to a member of the Victorian Legislative Assembly and the police in December 1878.

The document is named after the town of Jerilderie, New South Wales, where the Kelly Gang carried out an armed robbery in February 1879 during which Kelly tried to have his document published as a pamphlet. It was first called the 'Jerilderie Letter' by author Max Brown in his 1948 biography of Kelly, Australian Son.

Two copies were made of Ned Kelly's letter, one by publican John Hanlon and one by a government clerk. Only summaries of its contents were published during Kelly's lifetime: it was not published in full until 1930. The original and both handwritten copies have survived.

Ned Kelly and the Kelly Gang

Edward (Ned) Kelly was born in Victoria, Australia, around 1855. As a teenager he was frequently in trouble with the police, was arrested several times, and served time in prison.

In mid-1878, following his mother's imprisonment on perjured police evidence and feeling that the police were harassing him, Kelly took to bushranging with his brother, Dan, Joe Byrne, and Steve Hart. They became known as the Kelly Gang.

After the Kelly Gang shot dead three policemen at Stringybark Creek in Victoria in October 1878 they were declared outlaws.  Reacting to the killings, the Victorian Government enacted the Felons' Apprehension Act 1878 which authorised any citizen to shoot a declared outlaw on sight. A substantial reward was offered for each member of the Kelly Gang, 'dead or alive'.

Cameron/Euroa Letter
On 14 November 1878, the day before the members of the Kelly Gang were outlawed, a Victorian parliamentarian criticised the progress of the police hunt for the gang. In response to Donald Cameron’s criticism, Victorian Premier Graham Berry promised a 'searching enquiry' if sufficient evidence was provided. Kelly and Byrne read about this exchange in the newspapers and may have mistaken it as an opportunity to tell their side of the story. Kelly dictated a long letter to Byrne with the intention of sending it to Cameron.

On 9 December 1878, the Kelly Gang robbed the National Bank in Euroa, Victoria, after taking hostages at Younghusband's station nearby. Joe Byrne kept watch over the hostages at the station while the rest of the gang carried out the robbery, and some of the hostages recalled seeing Byrne working on a long letter.

Shortly after the Euroa robbery, Donald Cameron and Police Superintendent John Sadleir each received a copy of Kelly’s letter which he had signed 'Edward Kelly, enforced outlaw' and in which he attempted to tell his side of the events leading up to the killing of three policemen at Stringybark Creek in October 1878. The police advised against releasing the letter to the press for publication but reporters were permitted to read it. Newspaper accounts of the contents of Kelly's letter ranged from dismissive to sympathetic.

History
Kelly dictated his letter to fellow Kelly Gang member Joe Byrne sometime before the Gang's raid on the town of Jerilderie in southern New South Wales from 8 to 10 February 1879. Byrne then rewrote it in neater handwriting. The Jerilderie Letter appears to be a final version of the Cameron/Euroa letter that was circulated in December 1878.

Kelly took his document to Jerilderie where he intended to have it published as a pamphlet for public distribution. During the raid on the town, Kelly tried to find the town's newspaper editor and printer, Samuel Gill, aiming to have him print the letter. When he couldn’t find Gill, Kelly gave the letter to bank accountant Edwin Living demanding that he give it to Gill and warning "Mind you get it printed, or you'll have me to reckon with next time we meet". 
 
Living ignored Kelly's demands and set off on horseback with the document towards Deniliquin, New South Wales, 50 miles away, from where he planned to catch a train to Melbourne. J.W. Tarleton, the bank's manager, followed Living to Deniliquin.
 
When Living stopped to rest at John Hanlon's hotel eight miles from Deniliquin he gave an account of what had happened in Jerilderie. He allowed Hanlon to read Kelly's document and make a copy of the pages. The heading Hanlon gave to his copy of the letter is "Ned Kelly's Confession". The following morning Living and Tarleton took the train to Melbourne where they delivered Kelly's letter to the office of the Bank of New South Wales.

As with the Cameron/Euroa letter, the police advised against making Kelly's letter available to the public and it was not published in full until 1930. However, shortly after the Kelly Gang's raid on Jerilderie a summary of the contents of the letter was being published and commented on in Australian newspapers.

In July 1880 a government clerk made another copy of Kelly’s document when the prosecution case was being prepared for Kelly’s trial for murder in October 1880. The original was returned to Edwin Living after Kelly's trial and execution. 
 
Kelly's document was first called the "Jerilderie Letter" by author Max Brown in his 1948 biography of Kelly called Australian Son. Brown included the letter in full in his book and introduced it as an "8,300 word statement I have called The Jerilderie Letter".

Description
The Jerilderie Letter is 56 pages long and contains approximately 8000 words. It is written in the first person on notepaper 20.3 x 12.5 cm in size. There is little punctuation and it is not grammatically correct, however it contains very few spelling mistakes.

The original letter includes an undated note written by Edwin Living stating that "This is the document given to me by Ned Kelly when the Bank at Jerilderie was stuck up in Feby. 1879".

Content
In his document Kelly defends his bushranging actions, condemns the people he believed had wronged him and warns people not to defy him. He begins with the words "Dear Sir, I wish to acquaint you with some of the occurrences of the present past and future ..." and ends with a threat:

I give fair warning to all those who has reason to fear me to sell out and give £10 out of every hundred towards the widow and orphan fund and do not attempt to reside in Victoria but as short a time as possible after reading this notice, neglect this and abide by the consequences, which shall be worse than the rust in the wheat in Victoria or the druth of a dry season to the grasshoppers in New South Wales I do not wish to give the order full force without giving timely warning but I am a widows son outlawed and my orders must be obeyed.

The Jerilderie Letter has been described as both Kelly's "manifesto" and his "confession". In it, Kelly admits to crimes but claims he was forced into becoming a criminal because of police persecution of himself and his family. He also gives his version of the killing of three police officers at Stringybark Creek in Victoria in October 1878, arguing that he shot the men in self-defence: "... this cannot be called wilful murder for I was compelled to shoot them, or lie down and let them shoot me".

Kelly's hatred of the police is evident in the Jerilderie Letter. He outlines cases of alleged police corruption and calls on corrupt policemen to resign. At one point he calls police officers "a parcel of big ugly fat-necked wombat headed big bellied magpie legged narrow hipped splaw-footed sons of Irish Bailiffs or english landlords".

Kelly calls for justice for his family and for other poor Irish families who had settled in the north-east of Victoria. He also demands that squatters share their property and wealth with the poor. The Jerilderie Letter expresses pro-Irish and anti-British attitudes.

In describing the brutalisation of Irish convicts in Australia, Kelly paraphrases lines from "A Convict's Tour of Hell" and "The Convict's Lament on the Death of Captain Logan", poems attributed to Frank the Poet (Francis MacNamara), a convict who was imprisoned in Port Arthur at the same time as John "Red" Kelly, Ned's father. It is speculated that "Red" Kelly passed on MacNamara's poetry to his son.

What became of the Jerilderie Letter?
Two copies were made of Ned Kelly’s letter, one by publican John Hanlon and one by a government clerk. The original and both handwritten copies have survived.

The original
During the Kelly Gang's raid on Jerilderie, Kelly gave his document to bank accountant Edwin Living demanding that it be given to the town's newspaper editor for printing. Living ignored Kelly's threats and he and the bank's manager rode to nearby Deniliquin where they took a train to Melbourne to deliver the letter to the office of the Bank of New South Wales. After Kelly’s trial in October 1880 and execution on 11 November 1880 the letter was returned to Living and it remained in private hands until it was donated to the State Library of Victoria in 2000.

John Hanlon copy
On his way to Deniliquin to catch a train to Melbourne with Kelly's document, Edwin Living stopped to rest at John Hanlon's hotel eight miles from Deniliquin. It is believed that Living allowed Hanlon to read the document and make a copy of it before Living left the hotel taking the original with him. A report at the time said Living had forgotten the document when he left Hanlon's hotel and Hanlon had made a copy before sending the original to the Bank of New South Wales in Melbourne.

When Living called at Hanlon's hotel on his way back from Melbourne, he asked for the copy. Hanlon gave it to him after Living promised he would subsequently return it. The copy was not returned and Hanlon never saw his transcription again. The National Museum of Australia acquired Hanlon's copy in 2001.

Government copy
The original document was temporarily made available to the Victorian Government in July 1880 so that a copy could be made for the Crown prosecution case against Kelly during his trial for murder later that year. However, Kelly's defence counsel objected to the copy of the letter being tendered as evidence. The government copy, now held by the Public Record Office Victoria, was the basis for all published versions of the Jerilderie Letter until November 2000 when the original was donated to the State Library of Victoria.

Publication history
Summaries of the contents of the Jerilderie Letter were published during Ned Kelly's lifetime. The first synopsis was published in newspapers within weeks of the Jerilderie raid, but it was not published in full until 1930.

Jerilderie schoolteacher William Elliott read Kelly's document soon after Edwin Living returned to Jerilderie from taking it to the Bank of New South Wales in Melbourne. Elliott gave a synopsis of the document to Jerilderie newspaper editor Samuel Gill and Gill wired the synopsis to Melbourne. The Melbourne Age published the synopsis on 18 February 1879.

On 22 February, Gill also published the synopsis in his Jerilderie Herald and Urana Gazette. Other newspapers also published summaries of Kelly's document soon after the Jerilderie raid. At the end of its synopsis published on Friday 21 February 1879, the Burra Record (South Australia) concluded:

There is a boastful intemperate tone throughout the letter ... There is much in Kelly's letter unsuitable for publication, and it will consequently be withheld.
  
The full text of Kelly's document (with some corrections) was first published in The Register News-Pictorial (Adelaide, SA) in 1930 as part of a serialised account of the Kelly Gang by J.M.S. Davies called "The Kellys Are Out!". Between 1 November and 16 December 1930, "The Kellys are Out!" was also published in the Melbourne Herald with the Jerilderie Letter appearing in the 27 November to 2 December instalments. Teacher and activist J. J. Kenneally sued Davies claiming the serials were plagiarisations of his book Inner History of the Kelly Gang, published in 1929, and Davies' solicitors were forced to pay Kenneally compensation.

Max Brown included Kelly's letter in full in his 1948 biography of Ned called Australian Son. Brown was the first to call the document the 'Jerilderie Letter', which he introduced by saying:
 
Following is an 8,300 word statement I have called The Jerilderie Letter. This is the document Kelly handed to Living. The text is from a copy of the original letter made in 1879 or 1880 by a government clerk, and is printed here with such spelling, punctuation, etc, as the clerk or Kelly and Byrne, or all three possessed.

The original and both copies of the Jerilderie Letter have been digitised and are available online.

Influence on writers and painters

True History of the Kelly Gang - Peter Carey
Australian author Peter Carey has said that he was inspired to write his prize-winning novel True History of the Kelly Gang by Sidney Nolan's Ned Kelly paintings, the Jerilderie Letter and his admiration for James Joyce. Of his first reading of the Jerilderie Letter Carey said:
 
Somewhere in the middle Sixties, I first came upon the 56-page letter which Kelly attempted to have printed when the gang robbed the bank in Jerilderie in 1879. It is an extraordinary document, the passionate voice of a man who is writing to explain his life, save his life, his reputation … And all the time there is this original voice - uneducated but intelligent, funny and then angry, and with a line of Irish invective that would have made Paul Keating envious. His language came in a great, furious rush that could not but remind you of far more literary Irish writers.

Sidney Nolan Ned Kelly paintings
Australian artist Sidney Nolan has said that the main ingredients of his "Kelly" series of paintings were "Kelly's own words, and Rousseau, and sunlight". Kelly's words, including the Jerilderie Letter, "fascinated Nolan with their blend of poetry and political engagement".

References

External links

The Kelly collection, including John Hanlon's transcript of the Jerilderie letter at the National Museum of Australia
Education resources at National Museum of Australia
Jerilderie Letter Soundscape, State Library of Victoria (using voice, sound effects and music, this fictionalised version of real incidents drawn from historical sources recreates the events that led to Ned Kelly handing over his Jerilderie letter to Edwin Living) 
The Jerilderie Letter Event (a biannual event to celebrate Jerilderie's history by commemorating the Kelly Gang's 1879 raid of the town)

 

Letters (message)
1879 in Australia
1879 documents